Albert Einstein School (AES) is a private international school based in Ho Chi Minh City, Vietnam. The school belongs to The Canadian International School System (CISS), along with three other campuses: the Bilingual Canadian International School (BCIS), Canadian International School Vietnam (CIS) and Canada – Vietnam Kindergarten (CVK).

Founded in 2014, the school is located at the former CIS campus in Bình Chánh district, which was worth up to $21 million when it was inaugurated in 2010. The school was named after German-born physicist Albert Einstein (1879–1955). AES combines the Vietnamese curriculum of the Ministry of Education and Training (MoET) with the English program Pearson Edexcel for students from grade 1 to grade 12. AES focuses on developing integrated teaching activities for STEM curriculums.

Since 2019, AES has been the pioneer in implementing the Victorian Certificate of Education (VCE) program in Vietnam. The program is authorized and recognized by MoET and the Victorian Curriculum and Assessment Authority (through the partnership with Haileybury School). In its first four operating years, AES has nearly 700 students enrolled.

References

External links
 
 

International schools in Ho Chi Minh City
Canadian international schools in Vietnam